Mizoram is a land of rolling hills, valleys, rivers and lakes in Northeast India. As many as 21 major hills ranges or peaks of different heights run through the length and breadth of the state, with plains scattered here and there.

Landscape of Mizoram 

The folded structure of the Mizoram ranges are at the junction of two moving tectonic plates(Indian and Burmese Desi Kachar 1974). On 19 April 2011 there was a 4.3 earthquake about 10 km North of Kolasib and a 6.4 was recorded on 4 February 2011. Mizoram is in the highest zone 5 for earthquakes.

The folded hilly or mountainous North South belts, with perpendicular faults, comprise sediments of the Surma (Middle Bhuban Formation), Barail and Tipam groups. There is Alluvium in river beds consisting of deposits of argillaceous and arenaceous sandstones, shale, siltstones and mudstones and greywacke. A 560m thick rock succession of the Middle Bhuban type exposed between Bawngkawn and Durtlang shows 7 normal and 7 reverse magneto strata (North and South pole reversals) showing its age to be around 20 Million years old. The rock system is generally weak, unstable, weathered and prone to seismic and weather influence producing landslides. The soft, black to grey rock is used locally for building materials and for low trafficked road construction work. There are no useful minerals of economic significance apart from clays in the River Tlawng beds together with deposits of sand and gravels. Typical soils are sandy loam, clay loam that have been heavily leached due to the high slopes leaving it porous and lacking in minerals or humus.

A number of oil and gas exploration activities have taken place due to the geological condition with which Mizoram has been formed, leading to the possibilities and high expectation that reserves would be confirmed. France, Russia and Cyprus as well as several Indian companies have already signed a 12% oil and 10% gas royalty arrangement with proceeds going direct to Mizoram state on any production (April 2009)

Mountain Range

 Hmuifang With an elevation of 1619 metres, the mountain is still covered with virgin forests reserved since the Mizo Chief's time. Hmuifang is the way to Lunglei.
 Reiek with an elevation of 1548 metres, overlooking Aizawl and offers view of the surrounding valleys and hills, on a clear day the plains of Bangladesh can be seen from the top of the hill. Reiek Hill is surrounded by thick lush green temperate trees and bushes.
 Lengteng with an elevation of 2141 
 Mawma with an elevation of 2050 metres
 Surtlang with an elevation of 1967
 Lurhtlang with an elevation of 1935
 Tan Tlang with an elevation of 1837
 V.Partlang with an elevation of  1929 
 Chalhfilh Tlang with an elevation of 1865
 Hrangturzotlang with an elevation of 1854
 Zopui Tlang	with an elevation of 1850
 Tawizo  with an elevation of 1837
 Mawmrang with an elevation of  1812
 Purun Tlang with an elevation of  1756
 Saireptlang with an elevation of  1555
 Sakawrhmutuaitlang with an elevation of 1535
 Thorang Tlang	with an elevation of  1387.2
 Durtlang with an elevation of 1384
 Buia Hmun Tlang with an elevation of  1383
 Laipui Tlang	with an elevation of  1188
 South Hlimen Tlang (Lalsavunga Park) with an elevation of  1179
 Serkawn with an elevation of  1222

Rivers

 Chimtuipui River, also known as Kaladan originates in Chin State in Burma and passes through Saiha and Lawngtlai district in the Southern tip of Mizoram
Tlawng is a river of Mizoram, also known as river Dhaleswari in Assam, and joins Barak river Tributaries include the Tut, Teirei and the Ngashih. Aizawl lies in the Tlawng valley.
Tut is a river of Mizoram, northeastern India. It is a tributary of the Tlawng River.
Tuirial is a river of Mizoram, northeastern India. It flows in a northerly direction. It is impounded by the Tuirial Dam.
Tuivawl flows through the northern territory and eventually join the Barak River in Cachar District.
 Tiau	is a 159 km long river which forms an international boundary river between India and Myanmar.
 Khawthlangtuipui River (R.Karnaphuli) with length of 128.08 represent the drainage system of the whole south-western part of Mizoram.
 Tuichang with length of	120.75
 Tuichawng with length of	107.87
 Mat River, Mizoram  with length of 90.16
 Tuipui with length of	86.94
 Teirei with length of 70.84
It originates from Hmangkawn Village in Aizawl District. It flows northward to join the Tuirial River Northwest of Seling. It is about 55 km from Aizawl.
 Serlui with length of 56.33  flows through Kolasib district and is impounded by the Serlui B Dam.

Lakes
 The Palak lake, the biggest in Mizoram is situated in Saiha District which is part of southern Mizoram covering . It is believed that the lake was created as a result of an earthquake or a flood. The local people believe that a village which was submerged still remains intact deep under the waters.
Legend has it that a huge mustard plant once stood in this place. When the plant was cut down, jets of water sprayed from the plant and created a pool of water, thus the lake was named Ţamdil which means of 'Lake of Mustard Plant'. Today the lake is an important tourist attraction and a holiday resort.
 Rih Dil is located in Burma, a few kilometres from the India-Burma border. It was believed that the departed souls pass through this lake before making their way to Pialral or heaven.

Waterfalls

It is a two-tiered waterfall with a total height of 228.6 metres 
Tuirihiau falls  uniqueness is  that you see from behind as it caves in behind the fall like an arc

See also 

 Geography of India
 Tourism in Northeast India

References